The following is a list of episodes for the sitcom Blossom. The pilot episode premiered on NBC on July 5, 1990 before airing as a regular series from January 3, 1991 to May 22, 1995. A total of 114 episodes were produced spanning 5 seasons.

Series overview
At present, the first two seasons have been released in one DVD box set by Shout! Factory.

{| class="wikitable plainrowheaders" style="text-align:center;"
|-
! colspan="2" rowspan="2" |Season
! rowspan="2" |Episodes
! colspan="2" |Originally aired
! rowspan="2" |Rank
! rowspan="2" |Rating
! rowspan="2" |Viewers(millions)
|-
! First aired
! Last aired
|-
| bgcolor="FFBF00"|
| [[List of Blossom episodes#Season 1 (1990–91)|1]]
| 14
| July 5, 1990
| April 29, 1991
| 46
| 12.1
| 19.0
|-
| bgcolor="A91D28"|
| [[List of Blossom episodes#Season 2 (1991–92)|2]]
| 24
| September 16, 1991
| May 4, 1992
| 33
| 12.9
| 20.4
|-
| bgcolor="6C488F"|
| [[List of Blossom episodes#Season 3 (1992–93)|3]]
| 26
| August 10, 1992
| May 17, 1993
| 27
| 13.5
| 21.0
|-
| bgcolor="21ABCD"|
| [[List of Blossom episodes#Season 4 (1993–94)|4]]
| 28
| September 24, 1993
| May 23, 1994
| 32
| 12.2
| 18.5
|-
| bgcolor="8DB600"|
| [[List of Blossom episodes#Season 5 (1994–95)|5]]
| 22
| September 26, 1994
| May 22, 1995
| 55
| 10.4
| 15.6
|}

Episodes

Season 1 (1990–91)

Season 2 (1991–92)

Season 3 (1992–93)

Season 4 (1993–94)

Season 5 (1994–95)

External links

References

Lists of American sitcom episodes